Mohd Aizulridzwan bin Razali (born 19 November 1986) is a Malaysian footballer who plays for Kuala Lumpur Rovers mainly as a left back.

In his fourth consecutive season he looked set to finish empty-handed.

References

External links
 
1986 births
Living people
Malaysian footballers
Malaysia Super League players
Association football defenders
Petaling Jaya City FC players
Negeri Sembilan FA players
Felda United F.C. players
DRB-Hicom F.C. players
PKNS F.C. players